Calliotropis helix is a species of sea snail, a marine gastropod mollusk in the family Eucyclidae.

Description
The length of the shell reaches 20 mm.

Distribution
This marine species occurs off Taiwan and in the South China Sea.

References

 Vilvens C. (2007) New records and new species of Calliotropis from Indo-Pacific. Novapex 8 (Hors Série 5): 1–72

External links
 

helix
Gastropods described in 2007